The 2003 Women's Credit-Suisse Privilege World Open Squash Championship was the women's edition of the 2003 World Open, which serves as the individual world championship for squash players. The event took place in Hong Kong in China from 7 December until 13 December 2003. Carol Owens won her second World Open title, defeating Cassie Jackman in the final.

Seeds

Draw and results

Notes
Sarah Fitzgerald did not defend her title after retiring from competitive play.

Natalie Pohrer change her name back to Natalie Grainger and represented the United States after changing nationality.

See also
World Open
2003 Men's World Open Squash Championship

References

External links
Womens World Open

2003 in squash
World Squash Championships
Squash tournaments in Hong Kong
Squa
2003 in women's squash
International sports competitions hosted by Hong Kong